Vinja Vas is a settlement in the Gorjanci Hills in the City Municipality of Novo Mesto in southeastern Slovenia. The area is part of the traditional region of Lower Carniola and is now included in the Southeast Slovenia Statistical Region.

A small chapel with a belfry in the western part of the settlement is dedicated to Mary Help of Christians and belongs to the Parish of Podgrad. It was built in 1905 in a Neo-Romanesque style.

References

External links
Vinja Vas on Geopedia

Populated places in the City Municipality of Novo Mesto